= Franco-Swedish Treaty =

Treaty of Amity between Sweden and France in 1738

Franco-Swedish Treaty (1738)
- Type: Amity treaty
- Signed: December 1738
- Parties: Kingdom of France; (Swedish Empire) Sweden

The Franco-Swedish Treaty (1738) was a treaty of amity signed between France and Sweden.

== Stipulations ==
- Sweden promises not to conclude any alliance without first notifying France.
- In addition to paying a subsidy of 90,000, France pays 200,000 livres referred to as pensions and gratuities for Swedish ministers in French sources.
